Zygmunt Bauman (19 November 1925 – 9 January 2017) was a Polish sociologist and philosopher. He was driven out of the Polish People's Republic during the 1968 Polish political crisis and forced to give up his Polish citizenship. He emigrated to Israel; three years later he moved to the United Kingdom. He resided in England from 1971, where he studied at the London School of Economics and became Professor of Sociology at the University of Leeds, later Emeritus. Bauman was a social theorist, writing on issues as diverse as modernity and the Holocaust, postmodern consumerism and liquid modernity.

Early life and education

Bauman was born to non-observant Polish Jewish family in Poznań, Second Polish Republic, in 1925. In 1939, when Poland was invaded by Nazi Germany and the Soviet Union, his family escaped eastwards into the USSR.

Career
During World War II, Bauman enlisted in the Soviet-controlled First Polish Army, working as a political instructor. He took part in the Battle of Kolberg (1945) and the Battle of Berlin. In May 1945, he was awarded the Military Cross of Valour. After World War II he became one of the Polish Army's youngest majors.

According to the Polish Institute of National Remembrance, from 1945 to 1953 Bauman was a political officer in the Internal Security Corps (KBW), a military intelligence unit formed to combat the Ukrainian Insurgent Army and the remnants of the Polish Home Army. However, the nature and extent of his collaboration remain unknown, as well as the exact circumstances under which it was terminated.

In an interview with The Guardian, Bauman confirmed he had been a committed Communist during and after World War II and had never made a secret of it. He admitted that joining the military intelligence service at age 19 was a mistake although he had a "dull" desk job and did not remember informing on anyone.  While serving in the Internal Security Corps, Bauman first studied sociology at the Warsaw Academy of Political and Social Science. In 1953, Bauman, already in the rank of major, was suddenly dishonourably discharged, after his father had approached the Israeli embassy in Warsaw with a view to emigrating to Israel.  As Bauman did not share his father's Zionist tendencies and was indeed strongly anti-Zionist, his dismissal caused a severe, though temporary estrangement from his father. During the period of unemployment that followed, he completed his M.A. and in 1954 became a lecturer at the University of Warsaw, where he remained until 1968.

While at the London School of Economics, where his supervisor was Robert McKenzie, he prepared a comprehensive study on the British socialist movement, his first major book. Published originally in Polish in 1959, a revised edition appeared in English in 1972. Bauman went on to publish other books, including Socjologia na co dzień ("Everyday Sociology", 1964), which reached a large popular audience in Poland and later formed the foundation for the English-language text-book Thinking Sociologically (1990). Initially, Bauman remained close to orthodox Marxist doctrine, but, influenced by Georg Simmel and Antonio Gramsci, he became increasingly critical of Poland's Communist government. Owing to this he was never awarded a professorship even after he completed his habilitation. But after his former teacher, Julian Hochfeld, was made vice-director of UNESCO's Department for Social Sciences in Paris in 1962, Bauman did in fact inherit Hochfeld's chair.

Faced with increasing political pressure connected with a political purge led by Mieczysław Moczar, the Chief of the Polish Communist Security Police, Bauman renounced his membership of the governing Polish United Workers' Party in January 1968. The March 1968 events culminated in a purge that drove many remaining Communist Poles of Jewish descent out of the country, including those intellectuals who had fallen from grace with the Communist government. Bauman, who had lost his chair at the University of Warsaw, was among them. He had to give up Polish citizenship to be allowed to leave the country.

In 1968, he went to Israel to teach at Tel Aviv University. In 1970, he moved to Great Britain, where he accepted the chair of sociology at the
University of Leeds. There he intermittently also served as head of the department. After his appointment, he published almost exclusively in English, his third language, and his reputation grew.
 
From the late 1990s, Bauman exerted a considerable influence on the anti- or alter-globalization movement.

In a 2011 interview in the Polish weekly Polityka, Bauman criticised Zionism and Israel, saying Israel was not interested in peace and that it was "taking advantage of the Holocaust to legitimize unconscionable acts". He compared the Israeli West Bank barrier to the walls of the Warsaw Ghetto, where thousands of Jews died in the Holocaust. The Israeli ambassador to Poland, Zvi Bar, called Bauman's comments "half truths" and "groundless generalizations."

In 2013 Bauman made his first visit to Israel after he left it in 1970: he accepted an invitation offered by the Israeli Sociological Society to give a keynote lecture at the ISS Annual Meeting and conduct a seminar with Israeli PhD sociology students.

Bauman was a supporter of the Campaign for the Establishment of a United Nations Parliamentary Assembly, an organisation which advocates for democratic reform in the United Nations, and the creation of a more accountable international political system.

Family
Bauman was married to writer Janina Bauman, née Lewinson; 18 August 1926 – 29 December 2009. They had three daughters, painter Lydia Bauman, architect Irena Bauman, and professor Anna Sfard, a leading theorist of education at the University of Haifa. His grandson Michael Sfard is a prominent civil rights lawyer and author in Israel. Zygmunt Bauman died in Leeds on 9 January 2017.

Work
Bauman's published work extends to 57 books and well over a hundred articles. Most of these address a number of common themes, among which are globalisation, modernity and postmodernity, consumerism, and morality.

Early work
Bauman's earliest publication in English is a study of the British labour movement and its relationship to class and social stratification, originally published in Poland in 1960. He continued to publish on the subject of class and social conflict until the early 1980s. His last book was on the subject of Memories of Class. Whilst his later books do not address issues of class directly, he continued to describe himself as a socialist, and he never rejected Marxism entirely. The Neo-Marxist theorist Antonio Gramsci in particular remained one of his most profound influences, along with Neo-Kantian sociologist and philosopher Georg Simmel.

Modernity and rationality

In the late 1980s and early 1990s Bauman published a number of books that dealt with the relationship between modernity, bureaucracy, rationality and social exclusion. Bauman, following Freud, came to view European modernity as a trade off: European society, he argued, had agreed to forego a level of freedom to receive the benefits of increased individual security. Bauman argued that modernity, in what he later came to term its 'solid' form, involved removing unknowns and uncertainties. It involved control over nature, hierarchical bureaucracy, rules and regulations, control and categorisation — all of which attempted to remove gradually personal insecurities, making the chaotic aspects of human life appear well-ordered and familiar.
Later in a number of books Bauman began to develop the position that such order-making never manages to achieve the desired results. 

When life becomes organised into familiar and manageable categories, he argued, there are always social groups who cannot be administered, who cannot be separated out and controlled. In his book Modernity and Ambivalence Bauman began to theorise about such indeterminate persons in terms of an allegorical figure he called, 'the stranger.' Drawing upon Georg Simmel's sociology and the philosophy of Jacques Derrida, Bauman came to write of the stranger as the person who is present yet unfamiliar, society's undecidable. In Modernity and Ambivalence Bauman attempted to give an account of the different approaches modern society adopts toward the stranger. He argued that, on the one hand, in a consumer-oriented economy the strange and the unfamiliar is always enticing; in different styles of food, different fashions and in tourism it is possible to experience the allure of what is unfamiliar. Yet this strange-ness also has a more negative side. The stranger, because he cannot be controlled or ordered, is always the object of fear; he is the potential mugger, the person outside of society's borders who is a constant threat.

Bauman's most famous book, Modernity and the Holocaust, is an attempt to give a full account of the dangers of those kinds of fears. Drawing upon Hannah Arendt and Theodor Adorno's books on totalitarianism and the Enlightenment, Bauman developed the argument that the Holocaust should not simply be considered to be an event in Jewish history, nor a regression to pre-modern barbarism. Rather, he argued, the Holocaust should be seen as deeply connected to modernity and its order-making efforts. Procedural rationality, the division of labour into smaller and smaller tasks, the taxonomic categorisation of different species, and the tendency to view obedience to rules as morally good, all played their role in the Holocaust coming to pass. He argued that for this reason modern societies have not fully grasped the lessons of the Holocaust; it tends to be viewed—to use Bauman's metaphor—like a picture hanging on the wall, offering few lessons. In Bauman's analysis the Jews became 'strangers' par excellence in Europe. The Final Solution was pictured by him as an extreme example of the attempt made by society to excise the uncomfortable and indeterminate elements that exist within it. Bauman, like the philosopher Giorgio Agamben, contended that the same processes of exclusion that were at work in the Holocaust could, and to an extent do, still come into play today.

Postmodernity and consumerism
In the mid-to-late 1990s, Bauman began to explore postmodernity and consumerism. He posited that a shift had taken place in modern society in the latter half of the 20th century. It had changed from a society of producers into a society of consumers. According to Bauman, this change reversed Freud's "modern" tradeoff—i.e., security was given up in exchange for more freedom, freedom to purchase, consume, and enjoy life. In his books in the 1990s Bauman wrote of this as being a shift from "modernity" to "post-modernity".

Since the turn of the millennium, his books have tried to avoid the confusion surrounding the term "postmodernity" by using the metaphors of "liquid" and "solid" modernity. In his books on modern consumerism, Bauman still writes of the same uncertainties that he portrayed in his writings on "solid" modernity; but in these books he writes of fears becoming more diffuse and harder to pin down. Indeed, they are, to use the title of one of his books, "liquid fears" – fears about paedophilia, for instance, which are amorphous and have no easily identifiable reference.

Bauman is credited with coining the term allosemitism to encompass both philo-Semitic and anti-Semitic attitudes towards Jews as the other. Bauman reportedly predicted the negative political effect that social media have on voter's choice by denouncing them as 'trap' where people only "see reflections of their own face".

Art: a liquid element? 

One of Bauman works focuses on the concept of art as influenced by the liquidity of appreciation. The author puts forward the idea that "we desire and seek a realization that usually consists of a constant becoming, in a permanent disposition of becoming". In essence, our aim is not the object of our longing but the action of longing itself, and the worst peril is reaching complete satisfaction.

In this framework, Bauman explores how art can position itself in a world where the fleeting is the dominant paradigm. Art is substantially something that contributes to giving immortality to virtually anything: hence the philosopher wonders, "can art transform the ephemeral into an eternal matter?". Bauman concludes that the current reality is characterized by individuals who do not have time nor space to relate with the everlasting, with absolute and established values. Art and the relation of people with them, both in creating it and in participating in it, is dramatically changing. Citing Hannah Arendt, he asserts that "an object is cultural if it persists; its temporary aspect, its permanence, is opposite to the functional [...] culture sees itself threatened when all the objects in the world, those produced today and those of the past, are exclusively considered from the point of view of utility for the social process of survival". Withal, the concept of culture and art can only find a sense in the liquid society if it abandons its traditional understanding and adopts the deconstructive approach. Bauman gives as examples artworks by Manolo Valdés, Jacques Villeglé and Herman Braun-Vega.

Awards and honours
Bauman was awarded the European Amalfi Prize for Sociology and Social Sciences in 1992 and the Theodor W. Adorno Award of the city of Frankfurt in 1998. He was awarded in 2010, jointly with Alain Touraine, the Princess of Asturias Award for Communication and the Humanities.

The University of Leeds established 'The Bauman Institute' within its School of Sociology and Social Policy in his honour in September 2010. The University of Lower Silesia, a small private higher education institution in Lower Silesia, Poland, planned to award Bauman an honorary doctorate in October 2013. However, as a reaction to a major anti-communist and what Bauman supporters allege "anti-semitic" uproar against him, he eventually rejected the award.

In 2015 the University of Salento awarded Bauman an honorary degree in Modern Languages, Literature and Literary Translation.

Plagiarism allegations
In 2014, Peter Walsh, a PhD candidate at the University of Cambridge, accused Bauman of plagiarism from several websites, including Wikipedia, in his book Does the Richness of the Few Benefit Us All? (2013). In this book Bauman is said to have copied verbatim paragraphs from Wikipedia articles on Slow Food and steady-state economy, along with their bibliography, without attributing sources, authors or the fact that they were copied from Wikipedia. He did use a paragraph from the article on the golden handshake, but this citation was properly attributed to Wikipedia.

In a response, Bauman suggested that "obedience" to "technical" rules was unnecessary, and that he "never once failed to acknowledge the authorship of the ideas or concepts that I deployed, or that inspired the ones I coined". In a detailed critique of Walsh and co-author David Lehmann, cultural critics Brad Evans and Henry A. Giroux concluded: "This charge against Bauman is truly despicable. It's a reactionary ideological critique dressed up as the celebration of method and a back-door defence of sterile empiricism and culture of positivism. This is a discourse that enshrines data, correlations, and performance, while eschewing matters of substance, social problems, and power."

Bibliography

Warsaw period
 1957: Zagadnienia centralizmu demokratycznego w pracach Lenina [Questions of Democratic Centralism in Lenin's Works]. Warszawa: Książka i Wiedza.
 1959: Socjalizm brytyjski: Źródła, filozofia, doktryna polityczna [British Socialism: Sources, Philosophy, Political Doctrine]. Warszawa: Państwowe Wydawnictwo Naukowe.
 1960: Klasa, ruch, elita: Studium socjologiczne dziejów angielskiego ruchu robotniczego [Class, Movement, Elite: A Sociological Study on the History of the British Labour Movement]. Warszawa: Państwowe Wydawnictwo Naukowe.
 1960: Z dziejów demokratycznego ideału [From the History of the Democratic Ideal]. Warszawa: Iskry.
 1960: Kariera: cztery szkice socjologiczne [Career: Four Sociological Sketches]. Warszawa: Iskry.
 1961: Z zagadnień współczesnej socjologii amerykańskiej [Questions of Modern American Sociology]. Warszawa: Książka i Wiedza.
 1962 (with Szymon Chodak, Juliusz Strojnowski, Jakub Banaszkiewicz): Systemy partyjne współczesnego kapitalizmu [The Party Systems of Modern Capitalism]. Warsaw: Książka i Wiedza.
 1962: Spoleczeństwo, w ktorym żyjemy [The Society we inhabit]. Warsaw: Książka i Wiedza.
 1962: Zarys socjologii. Zagadnienia i pojęcia [Outline of Sociology. Questions and Concepts]. Warszawa: Państwowe Wydawnictwo Naukowe.
 1963: Idee, ideały, ideologie [Ideas, Ideals, Ideologies]. Warszawa: Iskry.
 1964: Zarys marksistowskiej teorii spoleczeństwa [ An Outline of the Marxist Theory of Society]. Warszawa: Państwowe Wydawnictwo Naukowe.
 1964: Socjologia na co dzień [Everyday Sociology]. Warszawa: Iskry.
 1965: Wizje ludzkiego świata. Studia nad społeczną genezą i funkcją socjologii [Visions of a Human World: Studies on the genesis of society and the function of sociology]. Warszawa: Książka i Wiedza.
 1966: Kultura i społeczeństwo. Preliminaria [Culture and Society, Preliminaries]. Warszawa: Państwowe Wydawnictwo Naukowe.
 2017: Szkice z teorii kultury [Essays in cultural theory]. Warszawa: Wydawnictwo Naukowe Scholar.  [First edition of a manuscript originally completed in 1967]

Leeds period
 1972: Between Class and Elite. The Evolution of the British Labour Movement. A Sociological Study. Manchester: Manchester University Press  (Polish original 1960)
 1973: Culture as Praxis. London: Routledge & Kegan Paul. 
 1976: Socialism: The Active Utopia. New York: Holmes and Meier Publishers. 
 1976: Towards a Critical Sociology: An Essay on Common-Sense and Emancipation. London: Routledge & Kegan Paul. 
 1978: Hermeneutics and Social Science: Approaches to Understanding. London: Hutchinson. 
 1982: Memories of Class: The Pre-History and After-Life of Class. London/Boston: Routledge & Kegan Paul. 
 c. 1985 Stalin and the Peasant Revolution: A Case Study in the Dialectics of Master and Slave. Leeds: University of Leeds Department of Sociology. 
 1987: Legislators and Interpreters: On Modernity, Post-Modernity, Intellectuals. Ithaca, NY: Cornell University Press. 
 1988: Freedom. Philadelphia: Open University Press. 
 1989: Modernity and the Holocaust. Ithaca, NY: Cornell University Press 1989. 
 1990: Paradoxes of Assimilation. New Brunswick: Transaction Publishers.
 1990: Thinking Sociologically. An Introduction for Everyone. Cambridge,  MA: Basil Blackwell. 
 1991: Modernity and Ambivalence. Ithaca, NY: Cornell University Press. 
 1992: Intimations of Postmodernity. London, New York: Routhledge. 
 1992: Mortality, Immortality and Other Life Strategies. Cambridge: Polity. 
 1993: Postmodern Ethics. Cambridge, MA: Basil Blackwell. 
 1994: Dwa szkice o moralności ponowoczesnej [Two sketches on postmodern morality]. Warszawa: IK.
 1995: Life in Fragments. Essays in Postmodern Morality. Cambridge, MA: Basil Blackwell. 
 1996: Alone Again – Ethics After Certainty. London: Demos. 
 1997: Postmodernity and its Discontents. New York: New York University Press. 
 1995: Ciało i przemoc w obliczu ponowoczesności [Body and Violence in the Face of Postmodernity]. Toruń: Wydawnictwo Naukowe Uniwersytetu Mikołaja Kopernika. 
 1997 (with Roman Kubicki, Anna Zeidler-Janiszewska): Humanista w ponowoczesnym świecie – rozmowy o sztuce życia, nauce, życiu sztuki i innych sprawach [A Humanist in the Postmodern World – Conversations on the Art of Life, Science, the Life of Art and Other Matters]. Warszawa: Zysk i S-ka. 
 1998: Work, Consumerism and the New Poor. Philadelphia: Open University Press. 
 1998: Globalization: The Human Consequences. New York: Columbia University Press. 
 1999: In Search of Politics. Cambridge: Polity. 
 2000: Liquid Modernity. Cambridge: Polity 
 2000 (Peter Beilharz ed.): The Bauman Reader. Oxford: Blackwell Publishers. )
 2001: Community. Seeking Safety in an Insecure World. Cambridge: Polity. 
 2001: The Individualized Society. Cambridge: Polity. 
 2001 (with Keith Tester): Conversations with Zygmunt Bauman. Cambridge: Polity. 
 2001 (with Tim May): Thinking Sociologically, 2nd ed. Oxford: Blackwell Publishers. 
 2002: Society Under Siege. Cambridge: Polity. 
 2003: Liquid Love: On the Frailty of Human Bonds, Cambridge: Polity. 
 2003: City of Fears, City of Hopes. London: Goldsmiths College. 
 2004: Wasted Lives. Modernity and its Outcasts. Cambridge: Polity. 
 2004: Europe: An Unfinished Adventure. Cambridge: Polity. 
 2004: Identity: Conversations with Benedetto Vecchi. Cambridge: Polity. 
 2005: Liquid Life. Cambridge: Polity. 
 2006: Liquid Fear. Cambridge: Polity. 
 2006: Liquid Times: Living in an Age of Uncertainty. Cambridge: Polity. 
 2006: Moralność w niestabilnym świecie [Morality in an instable World]. Poznań: Księgarnia św. Wojciecha. 
 2007: Consuming Life. Cambridge: Polity. 
 2008: Does Ethics Have a Chance in a World of Consumers? Cambridge, MA: Harvard University Press. 
 2008: The Art of Life. Cambridge: Polity. 
 2009: Living on Borrowed Time: Conversations with Citlali Rovirosa-Madrazo. Cambridge: Polity. 
 2009: (with Roman Kubicki, Anna Zeidler-Janiszewska) Życie w kontekstach. Rozmowy o tym, co za nami i o tym, co przed nami. [Life in contexts. Conversations about what lies behind us and what lies ahead of us.] Warszawa: WAiP. 
 2010: 44 Letters from the Liquid Modern World. Cambridge: Polity. 
 2011: Collateral Damage: Social Inequalities in a Global Age. Cambridge: Polity. 
 2011: Culture in a Liquid Modern World. Cambridge: Polity. 
 2012: This is Not a Diary. Cambridge: Polity. 
 2012: (with David Lyon) Liquid Surveillance: A Conversation. Cambridge: Polity. 
 2013 (with Leonidas Donskis): Moral Blindness: The Loss of Sensitivity in Liquid Modernity. Cambridge: Polity. 
 2013 (with Stanisław Obirek): O bogu i człowieku. Rozmowy. Kraków: Wydawnictwo Literackie. 
 translated as Of God and Man. Cambridge: Polity. 
 2013 (with Michael Hviid Jacobsen and Keith Tester): What use is sociology? Conversations with Michael Hviid Jacobsen and Keith Tester. Cambridge: Polity. 
 2013: Does the Richness of the Few Benefit Us All? Cambridge: Polity. 
 2014: (with Carlo Bordoni) State of Crisis. Cambridge: Polity. 
 2015: (with Rein Raud) Practices of Selfhood. Cambridge: Polity. 
 2015: (with Irena Bauman, Jerzy Kociatkiewicz, and Monika Kostera) Management in a Liquid Modern World. Cambridge: Polity. 
 2015: (with Stanisław Obirek) Of God and Man, Cambridge: Polity Press..
 2015: (with Stanisław Obirek) On the World and Ourselves, Cambridge: Polity. .
 2016: (with Leonidas Donskis) Liquid Evil. Cambridge: Polity. 
 2016: (with Ezio Mauro) Babel. Cambridge: Polity. 
 2016: Strangers at Our Door. Cambridge: Polity. 
 2017: Retrotopia. Cambridge: Polity. 
 2017: (with Thomas Leoncini) Nati Liquidi. Sperling & Kupfler. 
 2017: Zygmunt Bauman. Das Vertraute unvertraut machen. Ein Gespräch mit Peter Haffner, Hoffmann und Campe, Hamburg 2017, 
 2017: A Chronicle of Crisis: 2011–2016. Social Europe Editions.

See also
 Leszek Kołakowski

Notes

References

Further reading
 1995: Richard Kilminster, Ian Varcoe (eds.), Culture, Modernity and Revolution: Essays in Honour of Zygmunt Bauman. London: Routledge; 
 2000: Peter Beilharz, Zygmunt Bauman: Dialectic of Modernity. London: Sage; 
 2000: Dennis Smith, Zygmunt Bauman: Prophet of Postmodernity (Key Contemporary Thinkers). Cambridge: Polity; 
 2004: Keith Tester, The Social Thought of Zygmunt Bauman. Palgrave MacMillan; 
 2005: Tony Blackshaw, Zygmunt Bauman (Key Sociologists). London/New York: Routledge; 
 2006: Keith Tester, Michael Hviid Jacobsen, Bauman Before Postmodernity: Invitation, Conversations and Annotated Bibliography 1953–1989. Aalborg: Aalborg University Press; 
 2007: Keith Tester, Michael Hviid Jacobsen, Sophia Marshman, Bauman Beyond Postmodernity: Conversations, Critiques and Annotated Bibliography 1989–2005. Aalborg: Aalborg University Press; 
 2007: Anthony Elliott (ed.), The Contemporary Bauman. London: Routledge; 
 2008: Michael Hviid Jacobsen, Poul Poder (eds.), The Sociology of Zygmunt Bauman: Challenges and Critique. London: Ashgate; .
 2008: Mark Davis, Freedom and Consumerism: A Critique of Zygmunt Bauman's Sociology. Aldershot: Ashgate; .
 2010: Mark Davis, Keith Tester (eds), Bauman's Challenge: Sociological Issues for the 21st Century. Basingstoke: Palgrave Macmillan; 
 2013: Pierre-Antoine Chardel, Zygmunt Bauman. Les illusions perdues de la modernité. Paris: CNRS Editions; 
 2013: Shaun Best, Zygmunt Bauman: Why Good People Do Bad Things. Farnham: Ashgate; 
 2013: Mark Davis (ed.), Liquid Sociology: Metaphor in Zygmunt Bauman's Analysis of Modernity. Farnham: Ashgate; 
 2013: Paulo Fernando da Silva, Conceito de ética na contemporaneidade segundo Bauman. São Paulo: Cultura Acadêmica; 
 2016: Michael Hviid Jacobsen (Ed), "Beyond Bauman: Critical Engagements and Creative Excursions"? London: Routledge;  (hardback); 978-1-315-56917-8 (ebook)
 2016: Tony Blackshaw (Ed)," The New Bauman Reader: Thinking Sociologically in Liquid Modern Times", Manchester: Manchester University Press;  (hardback); 978-1-7849-9403-7 (paperback)
 2016: Carlo Bordoni (Ed), "Zygmunt Bauman. With an original contribution", in Revue Internationale de Philosophie, n. 3, vol. 70, 
 2017: Ali Rattansi, "Bauman and Contemporary Sociology: A Critical Analysis", Manchester: Manchester University Press (in press, to be published Spring 2017).
 2017: Sociedade, Linguagem e Modernidade Líquida. Interview By Leo Peruzzo; in Journal Diálogo Educacional, n. 6, vol. 47.
 2020: Shaun Best, Zygmunt Bauman on Education in Liquid Modernity, London, Routledge, 
 2020: Shaun Best, The Emerald Guide to Zygmunt Bauman (Emerald Guides to Social Thought), Bingley, Emerald Publishing Limited {978-1839097416}
 2020: Izabela Wagner, Bauman: A Biography. Cambridge: Polity; 
 2020: Sheila Fitzpatrick, "Whatever Made Him" (review of Izabela Wagner, Bauman: A Biography, Polity, June 2020, 510 pp.), London Review of Books, vol. 42, no. 17 (10 September 2020), pp. 9–11. "[This biography's] leitmotif is the dichotomy between Bauman's Polish and Jewish identities, the first being the one he chose, the second the one fixed on him by others, in particular other Poles. [p. 9.] [F]or all the difficulties and uprootings of his life, he not only stubbornly refused the role of victim but also managed to achieve the rare status – rare at least in interesting biographies – of being a happy man." (p. 11.)

External links

 Sociologist Zygmunt Bauman dies, hotrecentnews.com 
 Inhumanity is part of human nature, salon.eu.sk 
 Free full-text download of Alone Again – Ethics After Certainty (1996) from the official publisher Demos (PDF)
 "The Global Factory of Wasted Humans" – filmed conference of Z. Bauman (2003), archivesaudiovisuelles.fr
 Bauman interview (2011), vimeo.com 
 Video: The Ambiance of Uncertainty – Interview on Reset – Dialogues on Civilizations, resetdoc.org
 Zygmunt Bauman: Behind the World's 'crisis of humanity', youtube.com (23 July 2016)

1925 births
2017 deaths
20th-century Polish philosophers
21st-century Polish philosophers
Academics of the University of Leeds
Alumni of the London School of Economics
Anti-consumerists
British people of Polish-Jewish descent
Continental philosophers
Critics of postmodernism
Historians of Nazism
Historians of the Holocaust
Jewish philosophers
Jewish sociologists
Modernity
Military personnel from Poznań
Polish emigrants to the United Kingdom
Polish military personnel of World War II
Polish People's Army personnel
Polish sociologists
Polish United Workers' Party members
Polish Workers' Party politicians
Postmodern writers
Recipients of the Cross of Valour (Poland)
Recipients of the Gold Medal for Merit to Culture – Gloria Artis
University of Warsaw alumni
Academic staff of the University of Warsaw
Writers about globalization
Polish agnostics